Lalana-Tepinapa Chinantec is a Chinantecan language of Mexico, spoken in 30 towns in a remote region along the Oaxaca–Veracruz border. Outlying varieties of Lalana and Tepinapa Chinantec have only marginal intelligibility with each other. A third of speakers are monolingual.

References

Chinantec languages